Rainer Riesner (born 2 June 1950 in Friedberg) is a German pastor and theologian. He was ordained pastor in 1980, he has taught theology since 1998, with a focus on the New Testament, at TU Dortmund University. Since 1986 he has been married to Cornelia Riesner, a medical doctor. They have four children.

Riesner's studies on the New Testament have been groundbreaking in multiple areas. His doctoral dissertation was a comparison of Jesus's teaching methods with other contemporary methods. It gave special attention to the amount of memorization required of young boys in the home and the synagogue school. His comprehensive study of ancient Jewish and Christian sources led him to the conclusion that Jesus's followers had the capacity to memorize his teachings almost verbatim and to reliably pass them on in the early Christian gospels. This work was later published under the title Jesus als Lehrer ("Jesus as Teacher").  Riesner has continued to research and write extensively about the origin of the gospels and their value as historical sources.

Riesner's second major contribution was his study of the chronology of the apostle Paul's early work after his conversion to Christianity. This work was published as Die Frühzeit des Apostels Paulus (English translation Paul's Early Period). In addition to many original insights, this book is one of the most comprehensive surveys of scholarly opinions about the chronology of Paul's work and the spread of early Christianity.

Prof Riesner's writings cover many other topics including the geography and archaeology of ancient Palestine, the Essene community (by whom the Dead Sea Scrolls were perhaps written), and the crossroads of Protestant and Roman Catholic belief.

Works

References

External links 
 Review of the book Paul's Early Period: Chronology, Mission Strategy, Theology by Craig Blomberg
 Google Scholar profile

Living people
New Testament scholars
1950 births
German Protestant clergy
21st-century German Protestant theologians
German biblical scholars
Academic staff of the Technical University of Dortmund
People from Friedberg, Hesse
German male non-fiction writers